Jammu and Kashmir is a region administered by India as a union territory and consists of the southern portion of the larger Kashmir region, which has been the subject of a dispute between India and Pakistan since 1947, and between India and China since 1962. The Line of Control separates Jammu and Kashmir from the Pakistani-administered territories of Azad Kashmir and Gilgit-Baltistan in the west and north. It lies to the north of the Indian states of Himachal Pradesh and Punjab and to the west of Ladakh which is administered by India as a union territory.

Provisions for the formation of the union territory of Jammu and Kashmir were contained within the Jammu and Kashmir Reorganisation Act, 2019, which was passed by both houses of the Parliament of India in August 2019. The act re-constituted the former state of Jammu and Kashmir into two union territories, one being Jammu and Kashmir and the other being Ladakh, with effect from 31 October 2019.

Terminology 
Jammu and Kashmir is named after the two regions it encompasses  the Jammu region and the Kashmir Valley.

The Government of Pakistan and Pakistani sources refer to Jammu and Kashmir as a part of "Indian-occupied Kashmir" ("IOK") or "Indian-held Kashmir" (IHK). The Government of India and Indian sources in turn, call the territory under Pakistan control "Pakistan-occupied Kashmir" ("POK") or "Pakistan-held Kashmir" ("PHK").
"Indian-administered Kashmir" and "Indian-controlled Kashmir" are often used by neutral sources.

History 

The state of Jammu and Kashmir was accorded special status by Article 370 of the Constitution of India. In contrast to other states of India, Jammu and Kashmir had its own constitution, flag, and administrative autonomy. Indian citizens from other states were not allowed to purchase land or property in Jammu and Kashmir.

Jammu and Kashmir had three distinct areas: Hindu-majority Jammu region, Muslim-majority Kashmir Valley, and Buddhist-dominated Ladakh. Unrest and violence persisted in the Kashmiri Valley and, following a disputed state election in 1987, an insurgency persisted in protest over autonomy and rights.

The Bharatiya Janata Party (BJP) came to power in the 2014 Indian general election and five years later included in their 2019 election manifesto the revocation of Article 370 of the Constitution of India, in order to bring Jammu and Kashmir to equal status with other states.

A resolution to repeal Article 370 was passed by both the houses of the Parliament of India in August 2019. At the same time, a reorganisation act was also passed, which would reconstitute the state into two union territories, Jammu and Kashmir and Ladakh. The reorganisation took effect from 31 October 2019.

In September 2019, nearly 4,000 people, including two former Chief Ministers and hundreds of other politicians, were arrested by the Indian authorities in Kashmir; the state was put under a lockdown and communication and internet services were suspended.

Geography

Topography

Jammu and Kashmir is home to several valleys such as the Kashmir Valley, Tawi Valley, Chenab Valley, Poonch Valley, Sind Valley, and Lidder Valley. The Himalayas divide the Kashmir valley from the Tibetan plateau while the Pir Panjal range, which encloses the valley from the west and the south, separates it from the Punjab Plain of the Indo-Gangetic Plain. Along the northeastern flank of the Valley runs the main range of the Himalayas. The Jhelum River is the major Himalayan river which flows through the Kashmir valley. The southern Jammu region is mostly mountainous, with the Shivaliks, the middle and the great Himalayas running parallel to each other in a southeast-northwest direction. A narrow southwestern strip constitutes fertile plains. The Chenab, Tawi and Ravi are important rivers flowing through the Jammu region.

Climate

The climate of Jammu and Kashmir varies with altitude and across regions. Southern and southwestern areas have a sub tropical climate, with hot summers and cool winters. This region receives most of its rainfall during the monsoon season. In the east and north, summers are usually pleasant. The effect of the monsoon diminishes in areas lying to the leeward side of the Pir Panjal, such as the Kashmir valley, and much of the rainfall happens in the spring season due to western disturbances. Winters are cold, with temperatures reaching sub-zero levels. Snowfall is common in the valley and the mountain areas.

Administrative divisions

The union territory of Jammu and Kashmir consists of two divisions: Jammu Division and Kashmir Division, and is further divided into 20 districts.

Transport

Air
Jammu and Kashmir has two major airports at the two capitals of the territory: Jammu Airport at Jammu and Sheikh ul Alam Airport at Srinagar, which is also the only international airport in the territory. These airports have regular flights to Delhi, Mumbai, Bangalore, Chandigarh and other major cities of the country.

Railway

The under-construction Jammu-Baramulla line of the Northern Railways is the only railway line in the territory. Once complete, the line will connect the two regions of Jammu and Kashmir and will also provide a rail link to the Kashmir valley from other parts of the country.

Road

The Jammu-Srinagar National Highway, a segment of the NH44, is the main highway in the territory connecting the two capitals by road. National Highways 1, 144, 144A, 444, 501, 701 and 701A are the other NHs in the territory.

Demographics
As per the 2011 census, Jammu and Kashmir has a total population of 12,267,013. The sex ratio is 889 females per 1000 males. Around 924,485 (7.54%) of the population is scheduled caste and 1,275,106 (10.39%) belong to the scheduled tribes, mainly Gujjar, Bakerwal, and Gaddi. The SCs are mostly concentrated in the Jammu region.

Religion

Muslims constitute the majority of the population of Jammu and Kashmir with a large Hindu minority.

The Kashmir Division is predominantly Muslim (96.41%) with a small Hindu (2.45%) and Sikh (0.81%) population. Only 808 Kashmiri Hindu Pandit families remain in the valley after their forced displacement by Islamic militants. Shias are mostly concentrated in the Budgam district, where they form about 30-40% of the population.

The Jammu Division is predominantly Hindu (66%) with a significant Muslim population (30%). The Muslims form a majority in the Rajouri (63%), Poonch (90%), Doda (54%), Kishtwar (58%) and Ramban (71%) districts of Jammu, while the Hindus form a majority in Kathua (88%), Samba (86%), Jammu (84%) and Udhampur (88%) districts. Reasi district has an almost equal number of Hindus and Muslims.

The Dogras and various organizations of Hindu-majority Jammu region have demanded a separate state after bifurcation of the territory, on the basis of cultural, linguistic and religious differences from neighbouring Kashmiris (who are predominantly Muslim by faith).

Language

Kashmiri is the most-spoken language, is mainly spoken in the Kashmir Valley and in the upper reaches of the Chenab Valley, with a sizeable number of speakers in Jammu City. Dogri, related to Punjabi and Pahari, is spoken throughout the plains areas of Jammu division, as well as in parts of the hills. The hill people speak several languages. In the Pir Panjal Range, bordering Pakistan-administered Kashmir, the main language is Pahari-Pothwari, a western variety of Punjabi, as well as Gojri, the language of the Gujjar tribe. In the eastern hills of Jammu division are spoken various Western Pahari languages such as Siraji and Bhaderwahi, which merge with the dialects of western Himachal Pradesh. Urdu is also widely understood and spoken, particularly in the Kashmir region where it acts as the lingua franca alongside Kashmiri and also serves as a medium of instruction along with English, while Hindi is taught and understood in the southern areas of Jammu.

Education

According to the 2011 census, the literacy rate in Jammu and Kashmir was 67.17%, male literacy was 75%, while female literacy was at 56.43%.

Kashmir University located in Srinagar is the main university in the territory. Other universities include Jammu University, Sher-e-Kashmir University of Agricultural Sciences and Technology of Kashmir, Shri Mata Vaishno Devi University, Islamic University of Science & Technology, etc. Major institutions of higher education are NIT Srinagar, IIT Jammu, IIM Jammu, NIFT Srinagar and IHM Srinagar. Medical colleges include SKIMS, and the Government Medical College in Srinagar and AIIMS Vijaypur.

Government and politics

The union territory of Jammu and Kashmir is administered under the provisions of Article 239 of the Constitution of India. Article 239A, originally formulated for the union territory of Puduchery, is also applicable to Jammu and Kashmir.

Executive branch
The President of India appoints a Lieutenant Governor for the union territory.

A Council of Ministers led by a Chief Minister is appointed by the Lieutenant Governor from the membership of the legislative assembly. Their role is to advise the Lieutenant Governor in the exercise of functions in matters under the jurisdiction of the legislative assembly. In other matters, the Lieutenant Governor is empowered to act in his own capacity.

Legislative branch
The legislative branch of government is a unicameral legislative assembly, whose tenure is five years. The legislative assembly may make laws for any of the matters in the State List of the Constitution of India except "public order" and "police", which will remain the preserve of the central Government of India. The Lieutenant Governor also has the power to promulgate ordinances which have the same force as the acts of the legislative assembly.

Elections for the Jammu and Kashmir Legislative Assembly are to be held following the implementation of new constituency boundaries which is expected to be completed in 2021.

Judicial branch

The union territory is under the jurisdiction of the Jammu and Kashmir High Court, which also serves as the high court for Ladakh. Police services are provided by the Jammu and Kashmir Police.

Parties
The main political parties active in the region are the Bharatiya Janata Party (State President: Ravinder Raina), the Indian National Congress (State President: Ghulam Ahmad Mir), the Jammu & Kashmir National Conference (President: Farooq Abdullah) and the Jammu and Kashmir People's Democratic Party (President: Mehbooba Mufti). Other parties with a presence in the region include the Communist Party of India (Marxist), the Jammu and Kashmir National Panthers Party, the Jammu and Kashmir People's Conference, the Jammu and Kashmir Apni Party (President: Altaf Bukhari), the Jammu and Kashmir Workers Party (President: Mir Junaid) and Ikkjutt Jammu (President: Ankur Sharma).

Jammu and Kashmir in the Parliament of India
Jammu and Kashmir sends five members (MPs) to the lower house of the Indian parliament (the Lok Sabha) and four members to the upper house (the Rajya Sabha).

Lok Sabha constituencies in Jammu and Kashmir

Economy 

Jammu and Kashmir's economy is primarily services-based and agriculture-oriented. Along with horticulture and agriculture, tourism is an important industry for Jammu and Kashmir, accounting for about 7% to its economy.

The Kashmir Valley is known for its sericulture and cold-water fisheries. Wood from Kashmir is used to make high-quality cricket bats, popularly known as Kashmir Willow. Major agricultural exports from Jammu and Kashmir include apples, pears, cherries, plums, saffron and walnuts. The traditional Kashmiri handicrafts industry employs a large workforce of around 340 thousand artisans and has potential for producing export goods. Small-scale cottage industries include carpet weaving, silks, shawls, basketry, pottery, copper and silverware, papier-mâché and walnut wood. The horticulture sector is the next biggest source of income in the economy. The temperature of Jammu and Kashmir is also suited to floriculture and can support various species of flora.

Over 500 mineral blocks are present in Jammu and Kashmir, 261 of which are in the Kashmir Division alone. Kishtwar is known as the 'land of sapphire and saffron'. Resources such as timber, herbs and medicinal shrubs, edibles such as mushroom, chilgoza, black zeera, and saffron are available in the forests. The sapphire reserve mines of Machail, Paddar are a source of mineral wealth. Jammu and Kashmir is the only administrative unit in India with a large amount of borax and sapphire resources. It possesses 36 percent of the graphite, 21 percent marble and 14 percent of gypsum present in India. Coal, limestone and magnesite are found scattered among the different districts of the union territory.

Other minerals of significance that occur are bauxite, ball clay and china clay in Udhampur; bentonite in Jammu; diaspore in Rajouri and Udhampur; graphite in Baramulla; lignite and marble in Kupwara; quartz and silica sand in Anantnag, Doda and Udhampur; and quartzite in Anantnag district. In addition, the Department of Geology and Mining has determined the presence of minerals such as magnetite, dolomite, fuel mineral, decorative building stones, slate, and gemstones. All are materials with commercial and industrial uses in many products and factories.

The Jammu & Kashmir Bank, which is listed as a NIFTY 500 conglomerate, is based in the union territory.
Jammu and Kashmir is one of the largest recipients of grants from the central government annually. According to the Sustainable Development Goals Index 2021, 10.35 percent of the population of Jammu and Kashmir live below the national poverty line, the third-highest among union territories in the country.

Media 

The Telecom Regulatory Authority of India (TRAI) regulates all major aspects pertaining to media and telecommunications in Jammu and Kashmir. In addition, the Jammu and Kashmir administration released their media policy in 2020 which enabled government officers to sanction journalists and media organisations for disseminating "fake news," and is valid for the next five years. The policy attracted criticism for allegedly reducing people to "passive recipients of the information the government intends to disseminate." The Press Council of India (PCI) expressed concern over the provisions of fake news in the policy, as it "interferes with the free functioning of the press."

Major periodicals in Jammu and Kashmir include Greater Kashmir, Rising Kashmir, Kashmir Times,  Daily Excelsior, Elite Kashmir and Kashmir Monitor. DD Kashir is the state-owned television broadcaster. Popular private television channels are ETV Urdu and Gulistan News. In association with All India Radio, DD Kashir has established high power transmitters along the India–Pakistan border. Radio Sharda, a worldwide community radio service for Kashmiri Pandits, was started by Ramesh Hangloo. FM Tadka 95.0, BIG FM 92.7, Radio Mirchi and Red FM 93.5 are private FM radio stations.

Internet shutdowns are frequent in Jammu and Kashmir. As of February 2021, the region had 300 internet shutdowns since 2012. In 2020 alone, this number was 115, the highest of any year.

Sports 

Sports tournaments in Jammu and Kashmir are organised by both the Indian army and police, as well as mainstream political parties and the All Parties Hurriyat Conference. Sportspersons who represent India in tournaments face stigmatisation from separatists.

Jammu and Kashmir has 18 stadiums, 23 training centres, three indoor sports complexes and 42 government-maintained playing fields. Srinagar is home to the Sher-i-Kashmir Stadium, a stadium where international cricket matches have been played. The Maulana Azad Stadium in Jammu is one of the home venues for the Jammu and Kashmir cricket team. The Bakshi Stadium in Srinagar, named after Bakshi Ghulam Mohammad, hosts football matches.

Institutions such as the Jawahar Institute of Mountaineering and Winter Sports provides mountaineering, skiing and adventure courses. The Royal Springs Golf Course, Srinagar, located on the banks of Dal lake, is considered one of the best golf courses in India. Jammu and Kashmir was also host to the first Khelo India Winter Games, held in 2020 in Gulmarg. Jammu and Kashmir came first with the most gold medals at 26, followed by the Indian Army team with 8 gold medals. The second edition of the winter games were also held in Gulmarg in 2021, with Jammu and Kashmir coming first again.

Tourism 

Some major tourist attractions in Jammu and Kashmir are Srinagar, the Mughal Gardens, Gulmarg, Pahalgam, Patnitop, Bhaderwah and Jammu. Every year, thousands of Hindu pilgrims visit holy shrines of Vaishno Devi and Amarnath which has had significant impact on the state's economy.

The Kashmir valley is one of the top tourist destinations in India. Gulmarg, one of the most popular ski resort destinations in India, is also home to the world's highest green golf course. The decrease in violence in the state has boosted the state's economy, specifically tourism.

Jammu and Kashmir is also famous for its scenic beauty, flower gardens, apple farms and more. It attracts tourists for its unique handicrafts and the world-famous Kashmiri Shawls.

Notes

See also 

 Jammu and Kashmir (princely state), for the entity that existed till 1952
 Kashmiriyat
 Tourism in Jammu and Kashmir
 Kashmiri cinema
 Literature of Kashmir
 Music of Jammu and Kashmir
 Kus Bani Koshur Karorpaet
 DD Kashir
 AIR Srinagar
 University of Kashmir
 University of Jammu
 Central University of Kashmir
 Central University of Jammu
 Jammu and Kashmir cricket team
 Real Kashmir F.C.
 Jammu and Kashmir football team
 Jammu and Kashmir Police
 Jammu and Kashmir Light Infantry
 Jammu and Kashmir Rifles

References

External links

 Government of Jammu and Kashmir
 General Administration Department
 Lieutenant Governor of Jammu and Kashmir
 Jammu and Kashmir district portal

 

History of the Republic of India
States and territories established in 2019
2019 establishments in India
Urdu-speaking countries and territories
Kashmiri-speaking countries and territories
Territorial disputes of Pakistan
Disputed territories in Asia
Union territories of India
States and union territories of India